John XXIII: The Pope of Peace (also known as John XXIII, Pope John XXIII and Pope John XXIII: The Pope Of Peace) is a 2002 Italian television movie directed by Giorgio Capitani. The film is based on real life events of Roman Catholic Pope John XXIII.

Plot

Cast 

 Ed Asner as Angelo Giuseppe Roncalli
 Massimo Ghini as Young Angelo Roncalli  
 Claude Rich as Card. Alfredo Ottaviani
 Michael Mendl as Mons. Domenico Tardini
 Franco Interlenghi as Mons. Giacomo Radini-Tedeschi
 Sydne Rome as Rada Krusciova
 Roberto Accornero as Mons. Angelo Dell'Acqua
 Jacques Sernas as Cardinal Maurice Feltin
  Paolo Gasparini as  Mons. Loris Capovilla
 Ivan Bacchi as  Guido Gusso
 Bianca Guaccero as Maria  
  Heinz Trixner as Franz von Papen
 Sergio Fiorentini as Don Rebuzzini
  Emilio De Marchi as Uncle Saverio
 Guido Roncalli as Father Kurteff
  Vincenzo Bellanich as Cardinal Giuseppe Siri
  Alvaro Piccardi as Antonio Samorè
  Osvaldo Ruggieri as Pope Pius XI
 Tosca D'Aquino as Marianna Mazzola Roncalli
 Nicola Siri as Giovanni Roncalli
 Anna Valle as Rosa
 Mauro Rapagnani as Young Angelo Roncalli
  Petra Faksova as Sister Ivana

References

External links

2002 biographical drama films
2002 television films
2002 films
Films about popes
Films directed by Giorgio Capitani
Films set in Italy
Films set in the 20th century
Italian biographical drama films
Italian television films
Pope John XXIII
Cultural depictions of Franz von Papen
2000s Italian films